"Daydream Café" is Fayray's 4th single. It was released on May 12, 1999 and peaked at #41. The song was used as the ending theme for the ABC/TV Asahi series program "Ninkimono de Ikou!".

Track listing
Daydream Café
Daydream Café ～Nightdream Mix by Y・F
Daydream Café (original backing track)

Charts
"Daydream Café" – Oricon Sales Chart (Japan)

External links
FAYRAY OFFICIAL SITE

1999 singles
Fayray songs
1999 songs
Songs with lyrics by Akio Inoue
Songs written by Daisuke Asakura